The National Telecommunications Agency or Anatel is a special agency in Brazil created by the general telecommunications act (Law 9472, 16/07/1997) in 1997 and governed by Decree 2338 of 07/10/1997. The agency is administratively and financially independent, and not hierarchically subordinate to any government agency. Its decisions can only be appealed in court. From the Ministry of Communications, Anatel has inherited the powers of granting, regulating, and supervising telecommunications in Brazil as well as much technical expertise and other material assets.

See also
Federal institutions of Brazil
List of regulatory organizations of Brazil
Telecommunications in Brazil
ANACOM

References

External links

 How to Obtain an Anatel Product Homologation

Government agencies of Brazil
Executive branch of Brazil
Telecommunications regulatory authorities
Regulation in Brazil
1997 establishments in Brazil
Government agencies established in 1997